Theodore Miller Edison (July 10, 1898 – November 24, 1992) was an American businessman, inventor, and environmentalist. He was the fourth son and youngest child of inventor Thomas Edison, and founder of Calibron Industries, Inc. He was the third child of Edison with his second wife, Mina Miller Edison.

Biography
He was born on July 10, 1898, at Glenmont, the Edison home in Llewellyn Park in West Orange, New Jersey. He attended The Haverford School in Haverford, Pennsylvania, and later the Montclair Academy in Montclair, New Jersey, from which he graduated in 1916. Theodore ended his education at Massachusetts Institute of Technology. He earned a physics degree in 1923 and remained there another year to pursue graduate studies.

In 1925, he married Anna Maria (Ann) Osterhout, a graduate of Vassar College.

After graduation, Theodore worked for his father's company, Thomas A. Edison, Inc., starting as a lab assistant. He later founded his own company, Calibron Industries, Inc., and built his own smaller laboratory in West Orange. He earned over 80 patents in his career.

In later years he became an ardent environmentalist and helped preserve Corkscrew Swamp Sanctuary in southwest Florida. He was also an opponent of the Vietnam War and advocate of Zero Population Growth. He lived in West Orange, New Jersey and died from Parkinson's disease on November 24, 1992.

References

1898 births
1992 deaths
American environmentalists
American film studio executives
American inventors
American manufacturing businesspeople
Businesspeople from New Jersey
Theodore Miller
Montclair Kimberley Academy alumni
People from West Orange, New Jersey
Neurological disease deaths in New Jersey
Deaths from Parkinson's disease